Shohada (also Romanized as Shohadā; also known as Shohadā-ye Fahraj) is a village in Fahraj Rural District, in the Central District of Yazd County, Yazd Province, Iran. At the 2006 census, its population was 60, in 13 families.

References 

Populated places in Yazd County